Punjalkatte is a village in Beltangady taluk of Dakshina Kannada district of Karnataka in India. People here are very humble, helpful to each other, communal less village, and eco friendly. Some parts of this small town is in Bantwal taluk. This village is located on the Mangalore-Belthangady road. The name Punjalatte is derived from the term Pancha aladakatte. This was a humming village and trading centre during the medieval and British period. The town has two temples Panchakatte Sri Basavehvara temple and Goplakrishna temple, the first was built in the 15th century.  Punjalkatte has got two mosques, initially there was only one mosque, which is located in main highway, which was improved by late MR ABBU HAJI. He was having huge family, his off springs are spread all over the Punjalkatte. The village of late is getting amenities like degree college and a branch of Syndicate Bank.

References

External links 
  Punjalkatte

Villages in Dakshina Kannada district